Ski or Die is a 1990 winter sports game by Electronic Arts for the Amiga, NES, MS-DOS, and Commodore 64. It consists of five minigames which can be played individually or in a set sequentially. Up to six players can compete against each other via hotseat in four of the minigames, and semi-hotseat in one of them (up to two players at a time). The minigames are halfpipe-snowboarding, inflatable sled racing, aerial skiing, downhill skiing, and snowball fights.

The MS-DOS port supports Roland MT-32 and AdLib audio.

Gameplay

Reception

See also
Skate or Die!

References

External links

Ski or Die Fan Site

1990 video games
Skiing video games
Amiga games
Commodore 64 games
Nintendo Entertainment System games
DOS games
Electronic Arts games
Multiplayer and single-player video games
Video games scored by Rob Hubbard
Video games developed in the United States